"Don't Hurt My Little Sister" is a song by the American rock band the Beach Boys from their 1965 album The Beach Boys Today!. Written by Brian Wilson with additional lyrics by Mike Love, it was inspired by Wilson's interactions with sisters Marilyn, Diane, and Barbara Rovell. It was produced on June 22, 1964, making it the earliest-recorded song on the album.

The lyrical inspiration is often attributed to Wilson's conflicted infatuation for the Rovell sisters. In its lyrics, the narrator appears to conflate fraternal and romantic feelings for his younger sister, as he chides her male suitor, "Why don't you love her like her big brother?" Wilson later married Marilyn.

Cover versions of the song have been recorded by the Surfaris (in 1965) and Shonen Knife (in 1996). Wilson originally wrote the song for the Ronettes and submitted it to their producer, Phil Spector, for his approval. Spector accepted on the condition that the song be rewritten with different lyrics as "Things Are Changing (For the Better), a version ultimately recorded by the Blossoms.

Background and lyrics

Wilson originally wrote "Don't Hurt My Little Sister" for the Ronettes, modelling the chords and melodies after the hits of their producer Phil Spector. Asked if the song was "written about anyone in particular" in a 2022 interview, Mike Love responded:

The lyrical inspiration is often attributed to Wilson's conflicted infatuation for his girlfriend Marilyn and her sisters Diane and Barbara Rovell (the girls were aged 16, 17, and 13, respectively, while Wilson was 22).  According to Wilson's 2016 memoir, it was written "about me and the Rovells. I wrote it from the perspective of one of them telling me not to treat another one of them badly."

Biographer Peter Ames Carlin wrote that the subject matter "recounts Diane Rovell's pointed advice from the early (and surreptitious) days of Brian and Marilyn's affair, only with an uncomfortable fraternal ardor: Why don’t you love her like her big brother?" Music journalist Alice Bolin referred to it as one of the "creepier" songs on Today!, "in which the narrator chides a boy who has done his little sister wrong. 'Why don’t you kiss her,' he says a little too insistently ... As far as vaguely incestuous pop songs go, 'Don’t Hurt My Little Sister' was probably composed with innocent intentions. But we do know that in his early 20s Wilson had an interest in younger women."

Composition
Journalist Scott Interrante wrote, "while it may not be the most original composition on Today!, it's not without its interesting moments or sophisticated craft. Following the structure set up in Spector’s 'Be My Baby', the verses of 'Don’t Hurt My Little Sister' are simple and straightforward, while the pre-choruses are harmonically adventurous. But the chorus here, too, moves far away from the home key of B-flat in a sequence of chords led by a call-and-response vocal chanting."

Wilson later recycled the chord progression of the song's refrain for the band's "California Girls" (1965).

"Things are Changing (For the Better)"
Wilson submitted the song to Phil Spector for his approval. He had previously declined Wilson's "Don't Worry Baby", but agreed to record "Don't Hurt My Little Sister". According to biographer David Leaf,

Wilson was invited to perform piano on the song's recording, but was thrown out of the session by Spector due to "substandard playing". Spector finished a backing track, but scrapped the song. This backing track was later revived and given to the Blossoms. This new version, featuring Darlene Love on vocals, was a public service announcement for "equal-opportunity employment", a campaign by President Lyndon B. Johnson to "correct the inequality in employment opportunities between whites and minorities including blacks in the U.S.” The backing track was reused for versions by the Supremes and Jay and the Americans.

Recording
"Don't Hurt My Little Sister" was recorded during the sessions for The Beach Boys' Christmas Album on June 22, 1964 at Western Studio.

Personnel
As documented by Craig Slowinski.

The Beach Boys

Al Jardine – electric bass guitar, backing vocals
Mike Love – lead and backing vocals
Brian Wilson – upright piano, lead and backing vocals
Carl Wilson – 12-string lead/rhythm guitar, backing vocals
Dennis Wilson – tambourine, backing vocals

Additional musicians and production staff

Hal Blaine – drums
Chuck Britz – engineer
John Gray – grand piano
Ray Pohlman – baritone guitar, 6-string bass guitar
Tommy Tedesco – rhythm guitar

Cover versions

As "Don't Hurt My Little Sister"
 1965 – The Surfaris
 1996 – Shonen Knife, The Birds & the B-Sides

As "Things Are Changing (For the Better)"
 1965 – The Blossoms (as "Things Are Changing (For the Better)")
 1965 – The Supremes (as "Things Are Changing")
 1965 – Jay and the Americans (as "Things Are Changing")

See also
 "Wouldn't It Be Nice" – another song inspired by Wilson's infatuation with Diane Rovell

References
Citations

Bibliography

 
 
 

1965 songs
The Beach Boys songs
Songs written by Brian Wilson
Songs written by Mike Love
Song recordings produced by Brian Wilson
Songs about domestic violence